Routier or Routiers may refer to:

 Routier, Aude, a commune in the Aude department in southern France
 Routiers, mercenary soldiers of the Middle Ages
 Les Routiers, a travel guide book publisher
 Carolina Routier (born 1990), a Spanish triathlete
 Darlie Routier (born 1970), an American convicted murderer
 Routier, a fictional character in the video game Record of Agarest War Zero

See also 
 Rutter (disambiguation)